Palisades High School is a public high school in Kintnersville, Bucks County, Pennsylvania, in the United States. It is the only public high school that serves the Palisades School District, with students coming from Tinicum, Nockamixon, Springfield, Durham, and Bridgeton Townships and the borough of Riegelsville.

The school serves grades 9–12.  Many students take online courses taught by Palisades teachers to obtain credit in a specified course.  Online classes offered currently include 12th grade English, Global Perspectives, Health, Biology, and Algebra.

The school mascot is the pirate.

Athletics

Palisades competes in the Colonial League of the Pennsylvania Interscholastic Athletic Association (PIAA).

External links
Official website
Palisades High School sports coverage at The Express-Times

Public high schools in Pennsylvania
Schools in Bucks County, Pennsylvania